Craig Capano (born July 7, 1985) is an American soccer player, who last played for the Chicago Fire of Major League Soccer.

Capano was selected 17th overall in the 2002 MLS SuperDraft by the Fire, (the youngest player ever drafted by the Fire at the age of sixteen) having elected to forgo college to focus on his professional career.  Before joining the Fire, Capano had spent two years at the USSF's Bradenton Academy training with the U-17 U.S. national team.

Capano saw little playing time with the Fire, playing 92 minutes over four games in his first season and 122 minutes over 5 games in his second.  In 2004, his third season, he appeared to have reached a turning point, earning 440 minutes, scoring his first MLS goal, and being widely rated as one of the team's better players when he was finally given consistent playing time toward the end of the year.  However, he saw no time in 2005 after undergoing surgery on March 7, 2005 to repair a tear in his left anterior cruciate ligament, or in 2006. He was waived at the end of the latter season.

Despite playing little in MLS, Capano was a vital player for the U-20 US national team, along with other notables such as Eddie Gaven, Freddy Adu, Danny Szetela, and Jonathan Spector. He played in all four games of the 2004 Northern Ireland Milk Cup and served as the U-20 Men's National Team captain that July, helping the squad to finish 6th, also scoring the game's lone goal on April 21 for a 1-0 win over Haiti's U-20.

As of March, 2007, Capano was known to be training in camp with New York Red Bulls. Throughout his career, Capano - widely seen as a skillful player - has battled the perception that he was too small and slight to forge a successful career in MLS.

Career statistics

References

1985 births
Living people
American soccer players
Chicago Fire FC players
Chicago Sockers players
Major League Soccer players
United States men's youth international soccer players
United States men's under-20 international soccer players
Chicago Fire FC draft picks
People from Hyde Park, New York
Association football midfielders
Soccer players from New York (state)